Patrick Lewis Jr. (born January 30, 1991) is a former American football center. He played college football at Texas A&M. Lewis was signed by the Green Bay Packers as an undrafted free agent in 2013.

Early life and high school career
Lewis was born on January 30, 1991, in Reserve, Louisiana, to Patrick Sr. and Deidre Lewis. He grew up in LaPlace, Louisiana where he was enrolled in the St. John school system. He played high school football at East St. John High. While at East St. John, Lewis was rated the No. 4 center in the country and the No. 2 strongest offensive lineman in the class of 2009 by Rivals.com. SuperPrep named Lewis a Louisiana Top 40 recruit. The 5A-Louisiana Sports Writers Association named Lewis the First Team All-State Offensive Lineman.

College career
Lewis received offers from Texas A&M, Southern Miss, Tulsa and Connecticut. Lewis chose Texas A&M where as a true freshman he started 9 of 12 games during the 2009 season, playing as right guard. He started in all 13 games during his sophomore season in 2010. In his junior season in 2011, Lewis transitioned from guard to playing as center. While at A&M, Lewis was a University Studies major, with a focus in Agricultural and Life Sciences.

Professional career

Green Bay Packers
After going undrafted in the 2013 NFL Draft, Lewis signed with the Green Bay Packers on May 10, 2013. He was released by the Packers during final team cuts on August 31, 2013.

Cleveland Browns
On September 1, 2013, he was claimed off waivers by the Cleveland Browns. He was waived November 26 and re-signed to the Browns’ practice squad November 29.

Jacksonville Jaguars
On December 17, 2013, he was signed off of the Browns' practice squad by the Jacksonville Jaguars. The Jaguars released Lewis on August 24, 2014.

Seattle Seahawks
Lewis was claimed off waivers by the Seattle Seahawks on August 26, 2014. With Pro Bowl center Max Unger battling injuries, Lewis received more playing time than expected. In the 2014 season, he played in six games for the Seahawks, who kept a 4–0 record with Lewis as starting center. Even though Unger was traded to the New Orleans Saints in the offseason, Lewis was not named the starting center before the 2015 season. However, he regained the starting job from Drew Nowak prior to Week 10. He did an excellent job after regaining the center spot. On August 30, 2016, he was waived by the Seahawks.

Buffalo Bills
On August 31, 2016, Lewis was claimed off waivers by the Bills. On July 25, 2017, Lewis was released by the Bills.

Arizona Hotshots
On January 12, 2019, Lewis was signed by the Arizona Hotshots of the Alliance of American Football. The league ceased operations in April 2019.

Lewis was drafted in the 2020 XFL Draft by the Houston Roughnecks.

References

External links
Seattle Seahawks bio
Jacksonville Jaguars bio
Cleveland Browns bio
Texas A&M Aggies bio

Living people
1991 births
People from Reserve, Louisiana
Players of American football from Louisiana
American football offensive guards
American football centers
Texas A&M Aggies football players
Green Bay Packers players
Cleveland Browns players
Jacksonville Jaguars players
Seattle Seahawks players
Buffalo Bills players
San Antonio Commanders players
Arizona Hotshots players